Events from the year 1968 in Scotland.

Incumbents 

 Secretary of State for Scotland and Keeper of the Great Seal – Willie Ross

Law officers 
 Lord Advocate – Henry Wilson
 Solicitor General for Scotland – Ewan Stewart

Judiciary 
 Lord President of the Court of Session and Lord Justice General – Lord Clyde
 Lord Justice Clerk – Lord Grant
 Chairman of the Scottish Land Court – Lord Birsay

Events 
 15 January – 1968 Scotland storm ("Great Glasgow storm") leaves 20 dead across central Scotland including 9 in Glasgow.
 February – Upper Clyde Shipbuilders formed with 48.4% government holding by amalgamation of Fairfields, Govan; Alexander Stephen & Sons, Linthouse; John Brown & Company, Clydebank; Charles Connell and Company, Scotstoun; and Yarrow Shipbuilders.
 1 April – Reporting Scotland, BBC Scotland's national television news programme, is broadcast for the first time.
 14 May – Murder of Maxwell Garvie: Mariticide in Kincardineshire.
 18 May – Declaration of Perth: Conservative Party leader, Edward Heath proposes a directly elected Scottish Assembly.
 22 May – The General Assembly of the Church of Scotland permits the ordination of women as ministers.
 4 June – General Post Office introduces the first postbus in Scotland, Dunbar–Innerwick–Spott, East Lothian.
 18 November – James Watt Street fire: A warehouse fire in Glasgow kills 22.
 Bluevale and Whitevale Towers, 298 ft (90.8 m) blocks of flats, completed in Glasgow.

Births 
 31 January – John Collins, international footballer
 16 March – David MacMillan, Scottish-born organic chemist, recipient of Nobel Prize in Chemistry
 26 April – Daniela Nardini, actress
 4 July – Ronni Ancona, comic actress
 5 August – Colin McRae, rally driver (killed in helicopter accident 2007)
 2 September – David Dinsmore, journalist
 6 September – Christopher Brookmyre, detective novelist
 25 October – Jason Leitch, National Clinical Director of the Scottish Government
 22 November – Sarah Smith, television and radio news reporter
 23 November – Kirsty Young, television and radio presenter
 28 December – Pauline Robertson, field hockey player
 Andrew O'Hagan, writer
 Frank Quitely (Vincent Deighan), comic book artist

Deaths 
 17 February – Alexander Gray, economist, poet and translator (born 1882)
 7 April – Jim Clark, racing car driver (born 1936; killed in motor racing accident)
 12 September – Tommy Armour, golfer (born 1894)
 13 November – Joe Corrie, miner, poet and playwright (born 1894)

See also 
 1968 in Northern Ireland

References 

 
Scotland
Years of the 20th century in Scotland
1960s in Scotland